Athanasia Totsidou  (born June 19, 1989 in Munich, Germany) is a female professional volleyball player from Greece, who is a member of the Greece women's national volleyball team. At club level, she plays in Hellenic Volley League for Greek powerhouse Olympiacos Piraeus since July 2019.

Sporting achievements

National Team
 2018  Mediterranean Games

Clubs

National championships
 2019/2020  Hellenic Championship, with Olympiacos Piraeus

National trophies
 2012  Hellenic Super Cup, with AEK Athens

Individuals
 2012/13 Hellenic Championship - 2nd day: MVP
 2016/17 Hellenic Championship - 13th day: MVP
 2017/18 Hellenic Championship - 2nd day: MVP

References

External links
 Short biografy at proinos-typos.gr 
 Profile, achievements, team career at women.volleybox.net
 Profile at cev.eu
 Olympiacos Women's Volleyball team roster at CEV web site
 Hellenic Women National Team - caps www.volleyball.gr
 Profile at greekvolley.eu 
 Silver medal of Hellenic National Team in 2018 Mediterranean Games www.volleynews.gr 

1989 births
Living people
Olympiacos Women's Volleyball players
Greek women's volleyball players
Mediterranean Games silver medalists for Greece
Mediterranean Games medalists in volleyball
Competitors at the 2018 Mediterranean Games
Sportspeople from Drama, Greece
21st-century Greek women